The Rough Guide to the Music of Ethiopia is a world music compilation album originally released in 2004. Part of the World Music Network Rough Guides series, the release covers the music of Ethiopia, focusing largely on 1960s pop. The compilation was curated by Francis Falceto, who also produces Buda Musique's Éthiopiques series. Phil Stanton, co-founder of the World Music Network, was the producer.

This album was followed by a second volume, focusing on music of the early 21st Century, in 2012.

Critical reception

The compilation's release was met with generally positive reviews. Robert Christgau compared it with Éthiopiques (which had reached eighteen volumes by 2004), calling the recording "peaky" & "fluent". Writing for AllMusic, Adam Greenberg described it as an "outstanding album" portraying an "entirely unique" sound.

Track listing

References

External links
 

2004 compilation albums
World Music Network Rough Guide albums
Albums by Ethiopian artists